Bruderheim  is a town in the Edmonton Metropolitan Region of Alberta, Canada.

The town's name is derived from two German words: "Bruder" meaning brother and the suffix "-heim" meaning home. In English, it translates to "Home of the Brother".

History 

The Bruderheim area was the recipient of a notable meteorite fall on March 4, 1960—the Bruderheim meteorite.

Bruderheim Arena served as a shooting location for the 2005 film Santa's Slay.

Demographics 

In the 2016 Census of Population conducted by Statistics Canada, the Town of Bruderheim recorded a population of 1,308 living in 502 of its 622 total private dwellings, a  change from its 2011 population of 1,155.

The population of the Town of Bruderheim according to its 2014 municipal census is 1,348, a  change from its 2012 municipal census population of 1,298.

See also 
List of communities in Alberta
List of towns in Alberta

References

External links 

1908 establishments in Alberta
Edmonton Metropolitan Region
Towns in Alberta